The povit, or county, was a historical territorial-administrative and judicial unit in Ukraine, administered by a starosta. Following annexation of Ukraine (historically known as Cossack Hetmanate) by the Russian Empire in 17th-18th centuries, the Russian administration introduced the system of uyezds which locally were named in old manner as povits. After Ukraine regained its independence in 1918, povits remained until the introduction of raions in 1923.

Description
Counties were introduced in Ukrainian territories under Poland in the second half of the 14th century. More detailed norms were adopted in the Second Statutes of Lithuania of 1566.

They were introduced in the eighteenth century in the Cossack State by the judicial reforms of Hetman Kyrylo Rozumovskyi –while the system of Cossack regiments and companies remained in use as well (see Cossack host) – and they became administrative and financial entities in 1782. Under the Russian Empire, counties were also introduced in Sloboda Ukraine, Southern Ukraine, and Right-Bank Ukraine.

In 1913, there were 126 counties in Ukrainian-inhabited territories of the Russian Empire. Under the Austrian Empire in 1914, there were 59 counties in Ukrainian-inhabited Galicia, 34 in Transcarpathia, and 10 in Bukovina. Counties were retained by the independent Ukrainian People's Republic of 1917–1921, and in Czechoslovakia, Poland, and Romania until the Soviet annexations at the start of World War II. 99 counties formed the Ukrainian SSR in 1919, where they were abolished in 1923–25 in favour of 53 okruhas (in turn replaced by oblasts in 1930–32), although they existed in the Zakarpattia Oblast until 1953.

List of povits per each governorate

Volhynian Governorate
 Starokostiantyniv povit
 Iziaslav povit
 Novohrad-Volynskyi povit
 Polonne povit (created out of portions of Novohrad-Volynskyi povit)
 Zhytomyr povit
 Korosten povit (created out of portions of Ovruch povit)
 Ovruch povit

Kyiv Governorate
 Berdychiv povit
 Lypovets povit
 Uman povit
 Radomyshl povit
 Chornobyl povit (created out of portions of Radomyshl povit)
 Skvyra povit
 Zvenyhorodka povit
 Kyiv povit
 Bila Tserkva povit (renamed)
 Pereiaslav povit (transferred from Poltava Governorate)
 Bohuslav povit (renamed)
 Tarashcha povit

References 

Types of administrative division
Former subdivisions of Ukraine